Kalavu may refer to:
 Kalavu (2013 film), a Kannada film
 Kalavu (2019 film), an Indian Tamil-language crime thriller film